This is a list of films produced by the Tollywood (Telugu language film industry) based in Hyderabad in the year 1997.

1997

Dubbed films

References

1997
Telugu
 Telugu films
1997 in Indian cinema